Peter Jonathan Winston (March 18, 1958 – disappeared January 26, 1978) was an American chess player from New York City. He shared first prize in the 1974 U.S. Junior Chess Championship. Winston disappeared in mysterious circumstances in January 1978.  His last published FIDE rating was 2220.

Disappearance
In late 1977, Winston attended a FIDE-rated tournament at Hunter College High School in New York City. Despite being one of the highest-rated players in the tournament, Winston lost all nine of his games. A few months later, on January 26, 1978, following further surprising game losses, Peter Winston vanished and was never heard from again. According to some sources, Winston's disappearance occurred when he left his home without money, identification, or luggage during a severe winter storm. Many chess players who were close to or acquainted with Winston claim that the champion chess player's mental health had deteriorated, along with his game performance, in the last few years of his life, and that the decline in his mental health may have led to his disappearance.

Notable games

In the following game, Winston decisively defeats six-time U.S. Champion Walter Browne.  Winston annotated the game in the October 1972 Chess Life & Review, pages 625–26.

Winston vs. Browne, 1972 1.d4 c5 2.d5 Nf6 3.c4 e6 4.Nc3 exd5 5.cxd5 d6 6.e4 g6 7.f4 Bg7 8.Bb5+ Nfd7 9.Bd3 0-0 10.Nf3 Na6 11.0-0 Rb8 12.Nd2 Bd4+ 13.Kh1 Nf6 14.Nf3 Ng4 15.Bxa6 Bxc3 16.bxc3 bxa6 17.c4 Re8 18.e5 Rb4 19.h3 Nh6 20.Qd3 a5 21.Ba3 Ra4 22.Qb3 Bd7 23.Rfe1 Nf5 24.g4 Nh4 25.Ng5 dxe5 26.Ne4 exf4 27.Nxc5 Rxa3 28.Qxa3 Qc7 29.Rxe8+ Bxe8 30.Re1 Bd7 31.Nxd7 Qxd7 32.Qe7 Qxe7 33.Rxe7 f3 34.Kg1 Kf8 35.Rxa7 f5 36.c5 f4 37.c6  Black resigned.

See also
List of people who disappeared

References

External links
 
 
  (membership required)
 Mystery of Peter Winston

1958 births
American chess players
Missing person cases in New York City
1970s missing person cases
Sportspeople from New York City
Living people